Ciphers is an ambient music album by SETI which was released in 1996. It is Ysatis and Deupree's last release under the SETI moniker. This album also features trip-hop and jazz influences, as found in their contemporary Futique releases.

Track listing
 "Fragment.01" – 6:41
 "Fragment.02" – 8:35
 "Fragment.03" – 8:25
 "Fragment.04" – 9:29
 "Fragment.05" – 5:37
 "Fragment.06" – 9:08
 "Fragment.07" – 4:14
 "Fragment.08" – 3:30
 "First Fragment" – 4:57

References

1996 albums
SETI (band) albums